Rick Razzano may refer to:

 Rick Razzano (linebacker) (born 1955), linebacker for the Cincinnati Bengals and Toronto Argonauts
 Rick Razzano (running back) (born 1981), running back for the Tampa Bay Buccaneers